Lafarge Lake is a five-hectare man-made lake, located in Town Centre Park in central Coquitlam, British Columbia. The Evergreen Cultural Centre lies on the southwest corner of the lake, and the Water's Edge Festival is held on the lake shore for 25 continuous hours in March.

The area was originally a quarry, but in the 1970s the land was transferred to the city of Coquitlam, and a successful reclamation project ensued.

The lake is home to many species of waterfowl, as well as beavers, common carp, brown bullhead, bluegill, and is stocked with rainbow trout in the spring and fall.

References

External links
 Lafarge Lake
 Fishing in Lafarge Lake w/map
 

Landforms of Coquitlam
Lakes of British Columbia
New Westminster Land District